Rødovre Kommune is a municipality (Danish, 
kommune) in Region Hovedstaden on the island of Zealand in eastern Denmark. Its mayor is Britt Jensen. She is a member of the Social Democrats (Socialdemokraterne) political party who hold a majority of seats in the council.

History
The municipality was created in 1901 when the parish of Rødovre was split from Brønshøj-Rødovre parish; the Brønshøj part was simultaneously annexed by the city of Copenhagen.

The municipality reforms of 1970 and of 2007 both left the boundaries of Rødovre unchanged.

Erik Nielsen was replaced by Britt Jensen as mayor by a vote in the municipal council 19 March 2020 because the former made use of an official car although he only had one kilometer to work.  She was the only candidate.

Geography
The municipality covers an area of 12 km2, all part of the larger conurbation of Copenhagen.

Neighboring municipalities are Copenhagen to the east, Herlev to the north, Glostrup to the west, and Brøndby and Hvidovre to the south.

Demography
As of 1 January 2020 the municipality had 40,652 inhabitants of which 101 had no fixed address. The population number was 36,144 1 January 2008. Demographically Rødovre is a multi-cultured mixed suburb with no larger ethnic group of people. People from many different countries and middle-class/lower-class inhabitants live next to each other.

Sport
Rødovre is the home town of the ice-hockey team Rødovre Mighty Bulls.

Politics

Municipal council
Rødovre's municipal council consists of 19 members, elected every four years.

Below are the municipal councils elected since the Municipal Reform of 2007.

Curiosities 
  The Danish TV television show Rita is filmed in Islev, Rødovre.
 Peter Lundin a Danish serial killer, killed and dismembered his partner and her two sons while they were living in Rødovre.
 Michael Stützer, guitarist of Thrash Metal band Artillery is local

Twin towns

See also 

 Listed buildings and structures in Rødovre Municipality
 Rødovre station

References 

 Municipal statistics: NetBorger Kommunefakta, delivered from KMD aka Kommunedata (Municipal Data)
 Municipal mergers and neighbors: Eniro new municipalities map

External links 

 

 
Municipalities in the Capital Region of Denmark
Municipalities of Denmark
Copenhagen metropolitan area